This is a non-exhaustive list of Swiss federal referendums. See the navigation template at the bottom of the page for a more complete list.

June 2005 Swiss referendum
accession to the Schengen treaty, 56.63% yes.
February 2008 Swiss referendum
June 2008 Swiss referendum
November 2008 Swiss referendum
February 2009 Swiss referendum
continuation of the freedom of movement policy with the EU, 51.5% yes.
May 2009 Swiss referendum
September 2009 Swiss referendum
November 2009 Swiss referendum
ban on new minarets, 57.5% yes.
March 2010 Swiss referendum
September 2010 Swiss referendum
November 2010 Swiss referendum
February 2011 Swiss referendum

See also
 Federal popular initiative
 Voting in Switzerland

External links
 swissvotes.ch database on Swiss referendums
 official chronological list of referendums

 
Switzerland
Federal referendums
Federal referendums